The Harvard Classics, originally marketed as Dr. Eliot's Five-Foot Shelf of Books, is a 50-volume series of classic works of world literature, important speeches, and historical documents compiled and edited by Harvard University President Charles W. Eliot.  Eliot believed that a careful reading of the series and following the eleven reading plans included in Volume 50 would offer a reader, in the comfort of the home, the benefits of a liberal education, entertainment and counsel of history's greatest creative minds.  The initial success of The Harvard Classics was due, in part, to the branding offered by Eliot and Harvard University.  Buyers of these sets were apparently attracted to Eliot's claims. The General Index contains upwards of 76,000 subject references.

The first 25 volumes were published in 1909 followed by the next 25 volumes in 1910. The collection was enhanced when the Lectures on The Harvard Classics was added in 1914 and Fifteen Minutes a Day - The Reading Guide in 1916.  The Lectures on The Harvard Classics was edited by Willam A. Neilson, who had assisted Eliot in the selection and design of the works in Volumes 1–49.  Neilson also wrote the introductions and notes for the selections in Volumes 1–49.  The Harvard Classics is often described as a "51 volume" set, however, P.F. Collier & Son consistently marketed the Harvard Classics as 50 volumes plus Lectures and a Daily Reading Guide.  Both The Harvard Classics and The Five-Foot Shelf of Books are registered trademarks of P.F. Collier & Son for a series of books used since 1909.

Collier advertised The Harvard Classics in U.S. magazines including Collier's and McClure's, offering to send a pamphlet to prospective buyers. The pamphlet, entitled Fifteen Minutes a Day - A Reading Plan, is a 64-page booklet that describes the benefits of reading, gives the background on the book series, and includes many statements by Eliot about why he undertook the project.  In the pamphlet, Eliot states:

Dr. Eliot's Five-Foot Shelf of Books 
The idea of the Harvard Classics was presented in speeches by then President Charles W. Eliot of Harvard University.  Several years prior to 1909, Eliot gave a speech in which he remarked that a three-foot shelf would be sufficient to hold enough books to give a liberal education to anyone who would read them with devotion. He was inundated with requests for the list of those book titles that would fill the three-foot shelf. After many attempts to support his initial claim, he decided that the shelf would need to be lengthened to five feet - but a definitive list of works was not declared. A well-known publisher Peter Fenelon Collier and his son, Robert J. Collier, saw a financial opportunity and asked that Eliot make good on his statement by selecting 50 volumes (400 to 500 pages each). Collier representatives proposed the name for the series as either "The Harvard Library" or "The Harvard Classics" pending approval by Harvard University. The proposal, presented to the President and Fellows of Harvard College, was unanimously approved as a useful undertaking from an educational point of view.

In February 1909 with his approaching retirement as President of Harvard University, Eliot accepted the proposal of P.F. Collier & Son.  The agreement allowed Eliot to engage an assistant. He chose William A. Neilson, Professor of English at Harvard University. The English Bible was excluded because Eliot and Neilson felt that most every household would already possess at least one copy. The contributions of living authors (other than scientific contributions) were excluded because Eliot and Neilson considered the "verdict of the educated world" was not yet final. Works of modern fiction were felt to be readily accessible and thus excluded. English and American literature as well as documents related to American social and political ideas were more likely to be selected because the Harvard Classics were intended primarily for American readers.

Eliot retired as President of Harvard University in May 1909 and devoted much of the next year to organizing the 50 volumes and selecting the list of included works. The first half of the included works was provided to P.F. Collier & Son in 1909. However, Eliot and Neilson did not make the remaining selections, write the introductions for each selection, or finish the general index until 1910. Consequently, P.F. Collier & Son printed volumes 1 to 25 in 1909 and volumes 26 to 50 in 1910.  An advertisement for The Harvard Classics appeared in Collier's on April 30, 1909, stating the "Complete Official Contents Now Ready."  With the help of more than 50 Harvard professors and instructors and the general library of Harvard University and its department libraries, Eliot and Neilson believed that the title "The Harvard Classics" was well deserved.

Release and marketing 

In a June 1909 issue of Collier's Weekly, P.F. Collier & Son announced it would publish a series of books selected by Eliot, without disclosing the list of included works, that would be approximately five feet in length and would supply the readers a liberal education. A few days after the announced intent to publish Dr. Eliot's Five-Foot Shelf of Books, several newspapers published an incomplete list of selected works to be included. Eliot felt the publications were unauthorized and asked Collier's Weekly publishers to publish his letter to the editors explaining the initial list and selection process in the July 24, 1909, edition of Collier's. Eliot describes his goal in helping publish The Harvard Classics as motivated by an educational purpose and he explains why the English Bible was not selected. In January 1910, P.F. Collier & Son announced in a "Publishers' Statement" that the 50 volumes were almost complete and offered a "Statement from the Editor" (Eliot) describing the origins of process resulting in the first sets of The Harvard Classics. The first editions printed by P.F. Collier & Son in three separate styles of bindings were first offered for sale on October 13, 1909.

The collection was marketed so as to advertise in all the principal magazines published in the United States resulting in a combined circulation of almost 3,000,000 for the initial marketing effort. The sales were initiated using 3,000 agents who were supplied a prospectus or "Announcement of The Harvard Classics" so that leads could be followed up by the agents.  Most advertisements encouraged an interest notice be mailed back to the publisher offering a targeted and highly successful marketing campaign for the series. The intent by the publisher was to offer The Harvard Classics as a subscription with only some of the volumes being sent initially and the remaining to follow in subsequent shipment. This was strategic since the complete 50 volumes had not yet been supplied by Eliot and Neilson to the publisher and would not be supplied until late in 1910.

Printing history 

Volumes 1-49 of The Harvard Classics include reprints of hundreds of authors' works that may have been in the public domain (e.g., because of expired copyrights) or covered by existing copyright holders such as other publishing companies. In either case, Collier filed copyrights for the 49 volumes and for The Harvard Classics complete series in 1909 and 1910 and obtained, when necessary, permission to reprint selected works included in one of the 49 volumes. Collier's copyrighted Volume 50 was in 1910, the Lectures on The Harvard Classics in 1914, and Fifteen Minutes a Day - The Reading Guide in 1916.

P.F. Collier & Son asserts in many early adverstisements of The Harvard Classics that 20,000 sets of The Harvard Classics were first printed to offer a "tremendous savings" to buyers and that these first printings include the word "Eliot" as a watermark on every page.  To help the chronological obsession about the print runs of The Harvard Classics, clues regarding how many of first edition printings are offered in a trademark dispute case between P.F. Collier and E. Milton Jones in 1909 that was later ruled on in appeal in 1910 (in favor of P.F. Collier & Son). In testimony, Robert J. Collier states that the first sets of The Harvard Classics printed and sold were "bound in full morocco...one set, bound in three-quarters morocco...and the remaining set, bound in buckram...". Advertisements in 1910 also state Collier prepared editions for those who demand luxurious limited editions as well as for the readers who want less expensive sets.

The first editions of The Harvard Classics were known as "De Luxe" sets. Most were limited-quantity print runs and some "autographed" editions (only Volume 1 is authographed) include signatures by Eliot and in some cases Robert J. Collier. The first print runs in 1909 were for volumes 1 to 25. Another print run was needed in 1910 for volumes 26 to 50 because those volumes were not selected and edited by Eliot until the middle of 1910. The first editions include Japanese vellum paper with "Eliot" watermarks (made by S.D. Warren & Co. of Boston), deckled pages, silk moire endpapers, sewn in bookmarks, and top edged gilt pages. Each was appealing to buyers for the elaborate illustrations, frontispieces, plates, portraits, facsimiles, and crimson silk page markers (features unlikely to be found in later printings). The colophon found on the ultimate page of content of first editions notes these sets were "planned and designed by William Patten" (the Book Manager at P.F. Collier & Son).

The exact numbers of each of the three bindings making up the 20,000 first sets are unclear. Four different sets in full morocco leather were printed with raised bands, Harvard University insignia, and volume names in gilt lettering on the spines. The four variations in full leather include: (1) the "Alumni Autograph Edition" limited to 200 numbered sets (Volume 1 is autographed by Eliot), (2) the "Eliot Edition" limited to 1,000 numbered sets (Volume 1 is autographed by Eliot), (3) the "Alumni Edition De Luxe" (unsigned) limited to 1,000 numbered sets, and (4) the "Edition De Luxe" sets that are numbered and stated as being limited editions (but the number printed is not shown). The full morocco sets sold for at least $345. The Edition De Luxe sets in full morocco leather were sold many years (after the limited-quantity runs were sold out) as some include the "Lecture" volume added in 1914.

The second binding type of the first editions of The Harvard Classics were printed in three-quarters morocco leather binding over cloth boards. The first edition three-quarters morocco leather sets have similar variations as the full morocco leather sets including a (1) set limited to 1,000 numbered and autographed "Cambridge Editions" signed by Eliot and, interestingly, the publisher Robert J. Collier also signed the sets numbered from 412 to 973 over mottled cream boards, (2) set limited to 1,000 numbered and autographed "Eliot Edition" books over green cloth boards, and (3) a set limited to 1,000 (unsigned) called the "Alumni Edition" on the spine bound over crimson boards, and (4) a set of unknown number called the "Library Edition" (stated as limited edition, but number of printings is not shown) over crimson boards. The "Library Editions" do not paper with "Eliot" watermarks, but appear to have the same high-quality Japanese vellum paper. Each of these limited-quantity three-quarter morocco sets sold for $195.

The third type of binding of the first editions of The Harvard Classics were printed in fine buckram (green and crimson). The green buckram set of "Alumni Edition" printings is a numbered set limited to 1,000 numbered copies. The green buckram has gilt lettering with crimson and gold Harvard insignia on both the spine and front board. The first editions show "Alumni Edition De Luxe" are numbered and limited to 1,000 sets and include embossed bands on the spine. The remaining first edition set of The Harvard Classics, printed in fine crimson buckram cloth, is another version called the "Eliot Edition" - a limited quantity printing of 1,000. The crimson buckram "Eliot Edition" with Eliot's signature on the front board is printed with raised bands on the spine, "Eliot" watermarked pages, and include illustrations, frontispieces, plates, portraits, and facsimiles. This set does not include page markers. Both buckram first edition sets sold for $100.  Another set almost identical to the limited-quantity green buckram sets, is also in green buckram and has "Alumni Edition" on the spine.  This set was sold for many years and was limited to 10,000 printings. These second print runs of this set are almost identical to the first editions except the pastedown papers have much more faint printings, the limited edition page shows the editions as "Edition De Luxe," and watermarked "Eliot" pages are not included. 

In 1910, Collier began printing The Harvard Classics in a limited quantity set called the Renaissance edition. This beautifully bound set includes 10 different bindings consisting of reproductions of the artistic bindings of Royal Monarchs of Europe from the sixteenth to nineteenth centuries. Collier also began printing the National (1910) and Popular (1912) editions with lower price points in an effort, claimed by Collier in many advertisements, to honor the wishes of Eliot that The Harvard Classics are priced within everybody's reach. An extremely popular crimson-colored silk cloth set similar to the look of the De Luxe Morocco edition began printing in 1914 and was called the Cambridge edition. Variations of the Cambridge edition were printed for over a decade in cloth over hardboards and later (after 1919) in an imitation leather binding material called fabrikoid.

In 1919 Collier announced a new binding material for The Harvard Classic sets with the printing of a new set called the Southwark edition (in flexible dark green fabrikoid or imitation leather). The first set of the Southwark edition was printed in July 1919 and given to the Du Pont company. The set carries an inscription "This is the first set of Harvard Classics published by P.F. Collier & Son Company to be bound in DuPont Fabrikoid...". The set was named after the birthplace of one of the founders of Harvard College, John Harvard, who was born in London Borough of Southwark. The set is often referred to as the "Veritas" edition; however, the "Veritas" edition is bound in a dark crimson color promoted by DuPont. The new binding material, called fabrikoid, offered less weight, flexible boards, and bindings that were more durable than the cloth or leather bindings of the early editions.  Fabrikoid bindings were used in editions published from the 1920s to 1950's such as the varicolored Gemston edition which has five different colors of bindings and for larger editions with increased font sizes called the (home) Library editions that were marketed as being easier to read.

The "Eliot Foundation of Adult Education" set, which appears to have been first printed around 1932 (based on included educational materials dated 1932 and later), is a rare numbered set bound in dark blue pebbled cloth. This set has gold gilt lettering with a profile of Eliot on the spine. The set was the focus of a set of materials for adult education with syllabi, instructions for study, and classroom discussions points. The set has an embossed symbol used in many of the education materials developed by the Eliot Foundation on the front board with Versitas Scientia Humanitas (trans. trust, knowledge, and culture). The number of printings of this rare set is unknown. Later editions (with names such as Gemstone, Deluxe Registered, Veritas, Home Library, and Great Literature editions) were not quite as unique as price points were further lowered to make the Harvard Classics more affordable. These later editions were printed in various sizes and binding materials such as cloth, fabrikoid, bonded leather, and even later in various types of imitation and genuine leather often printed to imitate earlier editions.

P.F. Collier & Son printed the 50th edition (that is, different set) of The Harvard Classics in 1956.  Owners and prospective buyers of The Harvard Classics editions are often interested in the printing year of a particular edition.  As mentioned before, not even the first editions were fully printed in 1909. First editions were printed in 1909 and 1910, and all subsequent editions were printed in 1910 or later. A printer's key could be used to describe the print run, but these were not used in the U.S. until the middle of the twentieth century.  Copyright dates for book reprints are unlikely to identify the year of printing excepts for first four editions.  For The Harvard Classics series, copyright pages of The Harvard Classics have no information about the printing year (or run) until 1956 when the publisher began including information about the year of the print run.

Collier's renewed the copyrights for The Harvard Classics 28 years after filing the first copyrights for The Harvard Classics (as was customary at the time, as it offered some legal advantages) in 1936 and 1937.  Coliier's again renewed the copyrights in 1956 and 1959, and several times in the sixties as editions were printed in different page sizes and fonts (resulting is different pagination than described in initial copyright filings) and because some editions were printed and sold with fewer than 50 volumes.  In sum, copyright dates of The Harvard Classics editions offer misleading information about the printing date or printing year after the first editions were printed in 1909 and 1910.  For example, print runs following the publications of the first editions and until 1937 include copyrights dates of 1909 or 1910 although the printing year could be over 20 years later (or more).

Some clues about the printing history can help identify the print run year. For example, the inclusion of the "Lectures" began in 1914. Additionally, the "Editor's Introduction" in volume 50 includes a second "Editor's Introduction" that is dated in 1917. Fabrikoid was first used as binding for The Harvard Classics in 1919. Lastly, the publishing company marketed a larger size of books with the Home Library edition. This set of The Harvard Classics and subsequent editions are 15 percent larger than previous editions. None of these clues allow for an exact printing year, but each can be used to establish that the printing could not have occurred before a certain year, and of course, the printing cannot have occurred before the most recent copyright date.

The last edition of The Harvard Classics printed by P.F. Collier & Son (then a subsidiary of Crowell Collier & Macmillan, Inc.) was the 63rd printing in 1970 of a 22-volume called the "Great Literature Edition" in green fibrated (essentially bonded) leather with 22K decor that sold for $3.78 per volume ($1 each for the first three volumes).  The Federal Trade Commission filed a complaint in 1972 against Crowell Collier for deceptive selling practices of The Harvard Classics.  In a statement responding to the complaint, Crowell Collier stated that it no longer sells The Harvard Classics.  On March 24, 1973, the FTC provisionally accepted a consent order from Crowell Collier (now called Crowell, Collier and MacMillan, Inc.) that the publisher would stop trying to sell The Harvard Classics in one bulk shipment. The publisher ended the subscription plan used since 1909 and stated that it had no plans to sell The Harvard Classics one book at a time.

Enduring success 
As Adam Kirsch, writing for Harvard magazine in 2001, notes, "It is surprisingly easy, even today, to find a complete set of the Harvard Classics in good condition. At least one is usually for sale on eBay, the Internet auction site, for $300 or so, a bargain at $6 a book. The supply, from attics or private libraries around the country, seems endless — a tribute to the success of the publisher, P.F. Collier, who sold some 350,000 sets within 20 years of the series' initial publication".

Eliot and Neilson concluded that the 50 volumes were "so far as possible, entire works or complete segments of the world's written legacies" for English speaking readers.

Similar compendia 
 The concept of education through systematic reading of seminal works themselves (rather than textbooks) was carried on by John Erskine at Columbia University, and in the 1930s Mortimer Adler and Robert Hutchins at the University of Chicago carried this idea further with the concepts of education through study of the "great books" and "great ideas" of Western civilization. This led to the publication in 1952 of Great Books of the Western World, which is still in print and actively marketed. In 1937, under Stringfellow Barr, St. John's College introduced a curriculum based on the direct study of "great books". These sets are popular today with those interested in homeschooling.
 Gateway to the Great Books was designed as an introduction to the Great Books of the Western World, published by the same organization and editors in 1952.
 Palgrave's The Golden Treasury is a popular anthology of English poetry, originally selected for publication by Francis Turner Palgrave in 1861.
 The Oxford Book of English Verse is an anthology of English poetry that had a very substantial influence on popular taste and perception of poetry for at least a generation.
 The Loeb Classical Library is a series of books, today published by Harvard University Press, which presents important works of ancient Greek and Latin literature in a way designed to make the text accessible to the broadest possible audience.
 Sacred Books of the East is a 50-volume set of English translations of Asian religious writings published by the Oxford University Press between 1879 and 1910. It incorporates the essential sacred texts of Hinduism, Buddhism, Taoism, Confucianism, Zoroastrianism, Jainism, and Islam.
 The Delphian Society created the 10 Volume Delphian Course of Reading—with the Harvard Classics editor Eliot in mind—for young and developing minds.
The Everyman's Library is a series of reprints of classic literature, primarily from the Western canon.
 The Thinker's Library is a selection of essays, literature, and extracts from greater works by various classical and contemporary humanists and rationalists, continuing in the tradition of the Renaissance that were published between 1929 and 1951 for the Rationalist Press Association by Watts & Co., London, a company founded by Charles Albert Watts.

Contents

Vol. 1–10

Vol. 1: Benjamin Franklin, John Woolman, William Penn

 His Autobiography, by Benjamin Franklin
 The Journal of John Woolman, by John Woolman (1774 and subsequent editions)
 Fruits of Solitude, by William Penn

Vol. 2. Plato, Epictetus, Marcus Aurelius

 The Apology, Crito, and Phaedo, by Plato
 The Golden Sayings, by Epictetus
 The Meditations, by Marcus Aurelius

Vol. 3. Bacon, Milton's Prose, Thomas Browne

 Essays, Civil and Moral, and New Atlantis, by Francis Bacon
 Areopagitica and Tractate of Education, by John Milton
 Religio Medici, by Sir Thomas Browne

Vol. 4. Complete Poems in English, Milton

 Complete poems written in English, by John Milton

Vol. 5. Essays and English Traits, Emerson

 Essays and English Traits, by Ralph Waldo Emerson

Vol. 6. Poems and Songs, Burns

 Poems and songs, by Robert Burns

Vol. 7. The Confessions of St. Augustine, The Imitation of Christ

 The Confessions, by Saint Augustine The Imitation of Christ, by Thomas á Kempis

Vol. 8. Nine Greek Dramas

 Agamemnon, The Libation Bearers, The Furies, and Prometheus Bound, by Aeschylus
 Oedipus the King and Antigone, by Sophocles
 Hippolytus and The Bacchae, by Euripides
 The Frogs, by Aristophanes

Vol. 9. Letters and Treatises of Cicero and Pliny

 On Friendship, On Old Age, and Letters, by Cicero
 Letters, by Pliny the Younger

Vol. 10. Wealth of Nations, Adam Smith

 The Wealth of Nations, by Adam Smith

 Vol. 11–20 

Vol. 11. Origin of Species, Darwin

 The Origin of Species, by Charles Darwin

Vol. 12. Plutarch's Lives

 Lives, by Plutarch

Vol. 13. Aeneid, Virgil

 Aeneid, by Virgil

Vol. 14. Don Quixote, Part 1, Cervantes

 Don Quixote, part 1, by Miguel de Cervantes

Vol. 15. Bunyan & Walton

 The Pilgrim's Progress, by John Bunyan
 The Lives of Donne and Herbert, by Izaak Walton

Vol. 16. The Thousand and One Nights

 Stories from the Thousand and One Nights, translated by Edward William Lane, revised by Stanley Lane-Poole

Vol. 17. Folk-Lore and Fable, Aesop, Grimm, Andersen

 Fables, by Aesop
 Children's and Household Tales, by Jacob and Wilhelm Grimm
 Tales, by Hans Christian Andersen

Vol. 18. Modern English Drama

 All for Love, by John Dryden
 The School for Scandal, by Richard Brinsley Sheridan
 She Stoops to Conquer, by Oliver Goldsmith
 The Cenci, by Percy Bysshe Shelley
 A Blot in the 'Scutcheon, by Robert Browning
 Manfred, by Lord Byron

Vol. 19. Faust, Egmont, etc., Goethe, Doctor Faustus, Marlowe

 Faust, part 1, Egmont, and Hermann and Dorothea, by Johann Wolfgang von Goethe
 Dr. Faustus, by Christopher Marlowe

Vol. 20. The Divine Comedy, Dante

 The Divine Comedy, by Dante Alighieri

 Vol. 21–30 

Vol. 21. I Promessi Sposi, Manzoni

 I Promessi Sposi, by Alessandro Manzoni

Vol. 22. The Odyssey, Homer

 The Odyssey, by Homer

Vol. 23. Two Years Before the Mast, Dana

 Two Years Before the Mast, by Richard Henry Dana, Jr.

Vol. 24. On the Sublime, French Revolution, etc., Burke

 On Taste, On the Sublime and Beautiful, Reflections on the French Revolution, and A Letter to a Noble Lord, by Edmund Burke

Vol. 25. J.S. Mill and Thomas Carlyle

 Autobiography and On Liberty, by John Stuart Mill
 Characteristics, Inaugural Address at Edinburgh, and Sir Walter Scott, by Thomas Carlyle

Vol. 26. Continental Drama

 Life is a Dream, by Pedro Calderón de la Barca
 Polyeucte, by Pierre Corneille
 Phèdre, by Jean Racine
 Tartuffe, by Molière
 Minna von Barnhelm, by Gotthold Ephraim Lessing
 William Tell, by Friedrich von Schiller

Vol. 27. English Essays, Sidney to MacaulayThe Defense Of Poesy by Sir Philip SidneyOn Shakespeare by Ben JonsonOn Bacon by Ben JonsonOf Agriculture by Abraham CowleyThe Vision of Mirza by Joseph AddisonWestminster Abbey by Joseph AddisonThe Spectator Club by Sir Richard SteeleHints Towards an Essay on Conversation by Jonathan SwiftA Treatise on Good Manners and Good Breeding by Jonathan SwiftA Letter of Advice to a Young Poet by Jonathan SwiftOn the Death of Esther Johnson [Stella] by Jonathan SwiftThe Shortest-Way with the Dissenters by Daniel DefoeThe Education of Women by Daniel DefoeLife of Addison, 1672-1719 by Samuel JohnsonOf the Standard of Taste by David HumeFallacies of Anti-Reformers by Sydney SmithOn Poesy or Art by Samuel Taylor ColeridgeOf Persons One Would Wish to Have Seen by William HazlittDeaths of Little Children by Leigh HuntOn the Realities of Imagination by Leigh HuntOn the Tragedies of Shakspere by Charles LambLevana and Our Ladies of Sorrow by Thomas De QuinceyA Defence of Poetry by Percy Bysshe ShelleyMachiavelli by Thomas Babington Macaula

Vol. 28. Essays, English and American

William Makepeace ThackeryJonathan SwiftJohn Henry NewmanThe Idea Of A UniversityMatthew ArnoldThe Study Of PoetryJohn RuskinSesame And LiliesWalter BagehotJohn MiltonThomas Henry HuxleyScience And CultureEdward Augustus FreemanRace And LanguageRobert Louis StevensonTruth Of IntercourseSamuel PepysWilliam Ellery ChanningOn The Elevation Of The Laboring ClassesEdgar Allan PoeThe Poetic PrincipleHenry David ThoreauWalkingJames Russell LowellAbraham LincolnDemocracyVol. 29. Voyage of the Beagle, Darwin

 The Voyage of the Beagle, by Charles Darwin

Vol. 30. Faraday, Helmholtz, Kelvin, Newcomb, etc.

 The Forces of Matter and The Chemical History of a Candle, by Michael Faraday
 On the Conservation of Force and Ice and Glaciers, by Hermann von Helmholtz
 The Wave Theory of Light and The Tides, by Lord Kelvin
 The Extent of the Universe, by Simon Newcomb
 Geographical Evolution, by Sir Archibald Geikie

 Vol. 31–40 

Vol. 31. Autobiography, Cellini

 The Autobiography of Benvenuto CelliniVol. 32. Montaigne, Sainte-Beuve, Renan, etc.

 Essays, by Michel Eyquem de Montaigne
 Montaigne and What is a Classic?, by Charles Augustin Sainte-Beuve
 The Poetry of the Celtic Races, by Ernest Renan
 The Education of the Human Race, by Gotthold Ephraim Lessing
 Letters upon the Aesthetic Education of Man, by Friedrich von Schiller
 Fundamental Principles of the Metaphysic of Morals, by Immanuel Kant
 Byron and Goethe, by Giuseppe Mazzini

Vol. 33. Voyages and Travels

 An account of Egypt from The Histories, by Herodotus
 Germany, by Tacitus
 Sir Francis Drake Revived, by Philip Nichols
 Sir Francis Drake's Famous Voyage Round the World, by Francis Pretty
 Drake's Great Armada, by Captain Walter Bigges
 Sir Humphrey Gilbert's Voyage to Newfoundland, by Edward Haies
 The Discovery of Guiana, by Sir Walter Raleigh

Vol. 34. Descartes, Voltaire, Rousseau, Hobbes

 Discourse on Method, by René Descartes
 Letters on the English, by Voltaire
 On the Inequality among Mankind and Profession of Faith of a Savoyard Vicar, by Jean Jacques Rousseau 
 Of Man, Being the First Part of Leviathan, by Thomas Hobbes

Vol. 35. Froissart, Malory, Holinshead

 Chronicles, by Jean Froissart
 The Holy Grail, by Sir Thomas Malory
 A Description of Elizabethan England, by William Harrison

Vol. 36. Machiavelli, More, Luther

 The Prince, by Niccolò Machiavelli
 The Life of Sir Thomas More, by William Roper
 Utopia, by Sir Thomas More
 The Ninety-Five Theses, To the Christian Nobility of the German Nation, and On the Freedom of a Christian, by Martin Luther

Vol. 37. Locke, Berkeley, Hume

 Some Thoughts Concerning Education, by John Locke
 Three Dialogues Between Hylas and Philonous in Opposition to Sceptics and Atheists, by George Berkeley
 An Enquiry Concerning Human Understanding, by David Hume

Vol. 38. Harvey, Jenner, Lister, Pasteur

 The Oath of Hippocrates
 Journeys in Diverse Places, by Ambroise Paré
 On the Motion of the Heart and Blood in Animals, by William Harvey
 The Three Original Publications on Vaccination Against Smallpox, by Edward Jenner
 The Contagiousness of Puerperal Fever, by Oliver Wendell Holmes
 On the Antiseptic Principle of the Practice of Surgery, by Joseph Lister
 Scientific papers, by Louis Pasteur
 Scientific papers, by Charles Lyell

Vol. 39. Famous Prefaces

"Title, Prologue and Epilogues to the Recuyell of the Histories of Troy", by William Caxton
"Epilogue to Dictes and Sayings of the Philosophers", by William Caxton
"Prologue to Golden Legend", by William Caxton
"Prologue to Caton", by William Caxton
"Epilogue to Aesop", by William Caxton
"Proem to Chaucer's Canterbury Tales", by William Caxton
"Prologue to Malory's King Arthur", by William Caxton
"Prologue to Virgil's Eneydos", by William Caxton
"Dedication of the Institutes of the Christian Religion" by John Calvin
"Dedication of the Revolutions of the Heavenly Bodies" by Nicolaus Copernicus
"Preface to the History of the Reformation in Scotland", by John Knox
"Prefatory Letter to Sir Walter Raleigh on The Faerie Queene", by Edmund Spenser
"Preface to the History of the World" by Sir Walter Raleigh
"Prooemium, Epistle Dedicatory, Preface, and Plan of the Instauratio Magna, etc.", by Francis Bacon
"Preface to the Novum Organum", by Francis Bacon
"Preface to the First Folio Edition of Shakespeare's Plays" by Heminge and Condell
"Preface to the Philosophiae Naturalis Pricipia Mathematica", by Sir Isaac Newton
"Preface to Fables, Ancient and Modern", by John Dryden
"Preface to Joseph Andrews", by Henry Fielding
"Preface to the English Dictionary", by Samuel Johnson
"Preface to Shakespeare", by Samuel Johnson
"Introduction to the Propylaen", by J.W. von Goethe
"Prefaces to Various Volumes of Poems", by William Wordsworth
"Appendix to Lyrical Ballads", by William Wordsworth
"Essay Supplementary to Preface", by William Wordsworth
"Preface to Cromwell", by Victor Hugo
"Preface to Leaves of Grass", by Walt Whitman
"Introduction to the History of English Literature", by H.A. Taine

Vol. 40. English Poetry 1: Chaucer to Gray

Geoffrey Chaucer
 "The Prologue to the Canterbury Tales" 
 The Nun's Priest's TaleTraditional Ballads
 "The Douglas Tragedy"
 "The Twa Sisters"
 "Edward"
 "Babylon; or, The Bonnie Banks o Fordie"
 "Hind Horn"
 "Lord Thomas and Fair Annet"
 "Love Gregor"
 "Bonny Barbara Allan"
 "The Gay Goss-Hawk"
 "The Three Ravens"
 "The Twa Corbies"
 "Sir Patrick Spence"
 "Thomas Rymer and the Queen of Elfland"
 "Sweet William's Ghost"
 "The Wife of Usher's Well"
 "Hugh of Lincoln"
 "Young Bicham"
 "Get Up and Bar the Door"
 "The Battle of Otterburn"
 "Chevy Chase"
 "Johnie Armstrong"
 "Captain Car"
 "The Bonny Earl of Murray"
 "Kinmont Willie"
 "Bonnie George Campbell"
 "The Dowy Houms o Yarrow"
 "Mary Hamilton"
 "The Baron of Brackley"
 "Bewick and Grahame"
 "A Gest of Robyn Hode"
Anonymous
 "Balow"
 "The Old Cloak"
 "Jolly Good Ale and Old"
Sir Thomas Wyatt
 "A Supplication"
 "The Lover's Appeal"
Henry Howard, Earl of Surrey
 "Complaint of the Absence of Her Lover"
 "The Means to Attain Happy Life"
George Gascoigne
 "A Lover's Lullaby"
Nicholas Breton
 "Phillida and Coridon"
Anonymous
 "A Sweet Lullaby"
"Preparations"
 "The Unfaithful Shepherdess"
Anthony Munday
 "Beauty Bathing
Richard Edwardes
 "Amantium Irae"
Sir Walter Raleigh
 "His Pilgrimage"
 "The Lie"
 "Verses"
 "What Is Our Life"
Sir Edward Dyer
 "My Mind to Me a Kingdom Is"
John Lyly
 "Cupid and Campaspe"
 "Spring's Welcome"
Sir Philip Sidney
 "Song"
 "A Dirge"
 "A Ditty"
 "Loving in Truth"
 "Be Your Words Made, Good Sir, of Indian Ware"
 "To Sleep"
 "To the Moon"
Thomas Lodge
 "Rosalind's Madrigal"
 "Rosaline"
 "Phillis"
George Peele
 "Paris and  none"
Robert Southwell
 "The Burning Babe"
Samuel Daniel
 "Beauty, Time, and Love Sonnets"
 "To Sleep"
Michael Drayton
 "Agincourt"
 "To the Virginian Voyage"
 "Love's Farewell"
Henry Constable
 "Diaphenia"
Edmund Spenser
 Prothalamion Epithalamion "A Ditty"
 "Perigot and Willie's Roundelay"
 "Easter"
 "What Guile Is This?"
 "Fair Is My Love"
 "So Oft as I Her Beauty do Behold"
 "Rudely Thou Wrongest My Dear Heart's Desire"
 "Like as the Culver, on the Bared Bough"
William Habington
 "To Roses in the Bosom of Castara"
 "Nox Nocti Indicat Scientiam"
Christopher Marlowe
 "The Passionate Shepherd to His Love"
 "Her Reply" (Written by Sir Walter Raleigh)
Richard Rowlands
 "Our Blessed Lady's Lullaby"
Thomas Nashe
 "In Time of Pestilence"
 "Spring"
William Shakespeare
 "Winter"
 "O Mistress Mine"
 "Fancy"
 "Under the Greenwood Tree"
 "A Lover and His Lass"
 "Silvia"
 "Spring"
 "Lullaby"
 "Ophelia's Song"
 "Where the Bee Sucks"
 "Take, O Take"
 "A Madrigal"
 "Amiens' Song"
 "Dawn Song"
 "Dirge of Love"
 "Fidele's Dirge"
 Sonnets 18, 29, 30, 31, 32, 33, 54, 55, 57, 60, 64, 65, 66, 71, 73, 87, 90, 94, 97, 98, 104, 106, 107, 109, 110, 111, 116, 129, 146, 148.
Robert Greene
 "Content"
Richard Barnfield
 "The Nightingale"
Thomas Campion
 "Cherry-ripe"
 "Follow your Saint"
 "When to Her Lute Corinna Sings"
 "Follow thy Fair Sun"
 "Turn All thy Thoughts to Eyes"
 "Integer Vitae"
Robert Devereux, Earl of Essex
 "A Passion of my Lord of Essex"
Sir Henry Wotton
 "Elizabeth of Bohemia"
 "Character of a Happy Life"
Edward de Vere, Earl of Oxford
 "A Renunciation"
Ben Jonson
 "Simplex Munditiis"
 "The Triumph"
 "The Noble Nature"
 "To Celia"
 "A Farewell to the World"
 "A Nymph's Passion"
 "Epode"
 "Epitaph on Elizabeth L. H."
 "On Lucy, Countess of Bedford"
 "An Ode to Himself"
 "Hymn to Diana"
 "On Salathiel Pavy"
 "His Supposed Mistress"
 "To the Memory of My Beloved the Author, Mr. William Shakespeare and What He Hath Left Us"
John Donne
 "The Funeral"
 "A Hymn to God the Father"
 "Valediction, Forbidding Mourning"
 "Death"
 "The Dream"
 "Song"
 "Sweetest Love, I do not Go"
 "Lover's Infiniteness"
 "Love's Deity"
 "Stay, O Sweet"
 "The Blossom"
 "The Good Morrow"
 "Present in Absence"
Joshua Sylvester
 "Love's Omnipresence"
William Alexander, Earl of Stirling
 "To Aurora"
Richard Corbet
 "Farewell, Rewards and Fairies"
Thomas Heywood
 "Pack, Clouds, Away"
Thomas Dekker
 "Country Glee"
 "Cold's the Wind"
 "O Sweet Content"
Francis Beaumont
 "On the Tombs in Westminster Abbey"
 "Master Francis Beaumont's Letter to Ben Jonson"
John Fletcher
 "Aspatia's Song"
 "Melancholy"
John Webster
 "Call for the Robin-Redbreast"
Anonymous
 "O Waly, Waly"
 "Helen of Kirconnell"
 "My Love in Her Attire"
 "Love Not Me"
William Drummond
 "Saint John Baptist"
 "Madrigal"
 "Life"
 "Human Folly"
 "The Problem"
 "To His Lute"
 "For the Magdalene"
 "Content and Resolute"
 "Alexis, Here She Stayed; Among These Pines"
 "Summons to Love"
George Wither
 "I Loved a Lass"
 "The Lover's Resolution"
William Browne (?)
 "On the Countess Dowager of Pembroke"
Robert Herrick
 "Cherry-Ripe"
 "A Child's Grace"
 "The Mad Maid's Song"
 "To the Virgins"
 "To Dianeme"
 "A Sweet Disorder"
 "Whenas in Silks"
 "To Anthea who may Command Him Any Thing"
 "To Daffodils"
 "To Blossoms"
 "Corinna's Maying"
Francis Quarles
 "An Ecstasy"
George Herbert
 "Love"
 "Virtue"
 "The Elixir"
 "The Collar"
 "The Flower"
 "Easter Song"
 "The Pulley"
Henry Vaughan
 "Beyond the Veil"
 "The Retreat"
Francis Bacon, Viscount St. Alban
 "Life"
James Shirley
 "The Glories of our Blood and State"
 "The Last Conqueror"
Thomas Carew
 "The True Beauty"
 "Ask Me No More"
 "Know, Celia"
 "Give Me More Love"
Sir John Suckling
 "The Constant Lover"
 "Why So Pale and Wan"
Sir William D'Avenant
 "Dawn Song"
Richard Lovelace
 "To Lucasta, on Going to the Wars"
 "To Althea from Prison"
 "To Lucasta, Going Beyond the Seas"
Edmund Waller
 "On a Girdle"
 "Go, Lovely Rose!"
William Cartwright
 "On the Queen's Return from the Low Countries"
James Graham, Marquis of Montrose
 "My Dear and Only Love"
Richard Crashaw
 "Wishes for the Supposed Mistress"
 "Upon the Book and Picture of the Seraphical Saint Teresa"
Thomas Jordan
 "Let Us Drink and Be Merry"
Abraham Cowley
 "A Supplication"
 "Cheer Up, My Mates"
 "Drinking"
 "On the Death of Mr. William Hervey"
Alexander Brome
 "The Resolve"
Andrew Marvell
 "A Garden"
 "The Picture of Little T. C. in a Prospect of Flowers"
 "Horatian Ode upon Cromwell's Return from Ireland"
 "Song of the Emigrants in Bermuda"
 "Thoughts in a Garden"
Anonymous
 "Love Will Find Out the Way"
 "Phillada Flouts Me"
Earl of Rochester
 "Epitaph on Charles II"
Sir Charles Sedley
 "Chloris"
 "Celia"
John Dryden
 "Ode"
 "Song to a Fair Young Lady, Going Out of the Town in the Spring"
 "Song for St. Cecilia's Day"
 "Alexander's Feast"
 "On Milton"
Matthew Prior
 "To a Child of Quality"
 "Cloe"
 "The Dying Adrian to His Soul"
 "Epigram"
Isaac Watts
 "True Greatness"
Lady Grisel Baillie
 "Werena My Heart Licht I Wad Dee"
Joseph Addison
 "Hymn"
Allan Ramsay
 "Peggy"
John Gay
 "Love in Her Eyes Sits Playing"
 "Black-Eyed Susan"
Henry Carey
 "Sally in our Alley"
Alexander Pope
 "Solitude"
 "On a Certain Lady at Court"
 An Essay on ManAmbrose Philips
 "To Charlotte Pulteney"
Colley Cibber
 "The Blind Boy"
James Thomson
 "Rule, Britannia"
 "To Fortune"
Thomas Gray
 Elegy "Ode on a Distant Prospect of Eton College"
 "Hymn to Adversity"
 "Ode on the Spring"
 "The Progress of Poesy"
 "The Bard"
 "Ode on the Pleasure Arising from Vicissitude"
 "On a Favourite Cat, Drowned in a Tub of Gold Fishes"
George Bubb Dodington, Lord Melcombe
 "Shorten Sail"

 Vol. 41–50 

Vol. 41. English Poetry 2: Collins to Fitzgerald

William Collins
"Fidele"
"Ode Written in MDCCXLVI"
"The Passions"
"To Evening"
George Sewell
"The Dying Man in His Garden"
Alison Rutherford Cockburn
"The Flowers of the Forest"
Jane Elliot
"Lament for Flodden"
Christopher Smart
"A Song to David"
Anonymous
"Willy Drowned in Yarrow"
John Logan
"The Braes of Yarrow"
Henry Fielding
"A Hunting Song"
Charles Dibdin
"Tom Bowling"
Samuel Johnson
"On the Death of Dr. Robert Levet"
"A Satire"
Oliver Goldsmith
"When Lovely Woman Stoops"
"Retaliation"
"The Deserted Village"
"The Traveller; or, A Prospect of Society"
Robert Graham of Gartmore
"If Doughty Deeds"
Adam Austin
"For Lack of Gold"
William Cowper
"Loss of the Royal George"
"To a Young Lady"
"The Poplar Field"
"The Solitude of Alexander Selkirk"
"To Mary Unwin"
"To the Same"
"Boadicea: An Ode"
"The Castaway"
"The Shrubbery"
"On the Receipt of My Mother's Picture Out of Norfolk"
"The Diverting History of John Gilpin"
Richard Brinsley Sheridan
"Drinking Song"
Anna Laetitia Barbauld
"Life"
Isobel Pagan
"Ca' the Yowes to the Knowes"
Lady Anne Lindsay
"Auld Robin Gray"
Thomas Chatterton
"Song from Ælla"
Carolina Oliphant, Lady Nairne
"The Lond o' the Leal"
"He's Ower the Hills that I Lo'e Weel"
"The Auld House"
"The Laird o' Cockpen"
"The Rowan Tree"
"Wha'll be King but Charlie?"
"Charlie Is My Darling"
Alexander Ross
"Wooed and Married and A'"
John Skinner
"Tullochgorum"
Michael Bruce
"To the Cuckoo"
George Halket
"Logie o' Buchan"
William Hamilton of Bangour
"The Braes of Yarrow"
Hector MacNeil
"I Lo'ed Ne'er a Laddie but Ane"
"Come Under My Plaidie"
Sir William Jones
"An Ode"
"On Parent Knees a Naked New-born Child"
Susanna Blamire
"And Ye Shall Walk in Silk Attire"
Anne Hunter
"My Mother Bids Me Bind My Hair"
John Dunlop
"The Year, That's Awa'"
Samuel Rogers
"A Wish"
"The Sleeping Beauty"
William Blake
"The Tiger"
"Ah! Sun-flower"
"To Spring"
"Reeds of Innocence"
"Night"
"Auguries of Innocence"
"Nurse's Song"
"Holy Thursday"
"The Divine Image"
"Song"
John Collins
"To-Morrow"
Robert Tannahill
"Jessie, the Flower o' Dunblane"
"Gloomy Winter's Now Awa'"
William Wordsworth
"Ode on Intimations of Immortality from Recollections of Early Childhood"
"My Heart Leaps Up"
"The Two April Mornings"
"The Fountain"
"Written in March"
"Nature and the Poet"
"Ruth: Or the Influence of Nature"
"A Lesson"
"Michael"
"Yarrow Unvisited"
"Yarrow Visited"
"Yarrow Revisited"
"Lines Composed a Few Miles Above Tintern Abbey"
"The Daffodils"
"To the Daisy"
"To the Cuckoo"
"The Green Linnet"
"Written in Early Spring"
"To the Skylark"
"The Affliction of Margaret"
"Simon Lee the Old Huntsman"
"Ode to Duty"
"She Was a Phantom of Delight"
"To the Highland Girl of Inversneyde"
"The Solitary Reaper"
"The Reverie of Poor Susan"
"To Toussaint L'Ouverture"
"Character of the Happy Warrior"
"Resolution and Independence"
"Laodamia"
"We Are Seven"
"Lucy"
"The Inner Vision"
"By the Sea"
"Upon Westminster Bridge"
"To a Distant Friend"
"Desiseria"
"We Must Be Free or Die"
"England and Switzerland"
"On the Extonction of the Venetian Republic"
"London, MDCCCII"
"The Same"
"When I Have Borne"
"The World is Too Much With Us"
"Within King's College Chapel, Cambridge"
"Valedictory Sonnet to the River Duddon"
"Composed at Neidpath Castle, the Property of Lord Queensbury"
"Admonition to a Traveller"
"To Sleep"
"The Sonnet"
William Lisle Bowles
"Dover Cliffs"
Samuel Taylor ColeridgeThe Rime of the Ancient Mariner"Kubla Khan"
"Youth and Age"
"Love"
"Hymn Before Sunrise, in the Vale of Chamouni"Christabel"Dejection: an Ode"
Robert Southey
"After Blenheim"
"The Scholar"
Charles Lamb
"The Old Familiar Faces"
"Hester"
"On an Infant Dying as Soon as Born"
Sir Walter Scott
"The Outlaw"
"To a Lock of Hair"
"Jock of Hazeldean"
"Eleu Loro"
"A Serenade"
"The Rover"
"The Maid of Neidpath"
"Gathering Song of Donald the Black"
"Border Ballad"
"The Pride of Youth"
"Coronach"
"Lucy Ashton's Song"
"Answer"
"Rosabelle"
"Hunting Song"
"Lochinvar"
"Bonny Dundee"
"Datur Hora Quieti"
"Here's a Health to King Charles
"Harp of the North, Farewell!"
James Hogg
"Kilmeny"
"When the Kye Comes Hame"
"The Skylark"
"Lock the Door, Lariston"
Robert Surtees
"Barthram's Dirge"
Thomas Campbell
"The Soldier's Dream"
"To the Evening Star"
"Ode to Winter"
"Lord Ullin's Daughter"
"The River of Life"
"To the Evening Star"
"The Maid of Neidpath"
"Ye Mariners of England"
"Battle of the Baltic"
"Hohenlinden"
J. Campbell
"Freedom and Love"
Allan Cunningham
"Hame, Hame, Hame"
"A Wet Sheet and a Flowing Sea"
George Gordon, Lord Byron
"Youth and Age"
"The Destruction of Sennacherib"
"Elegy on Thyrza"
"When We Two Parted"
"For Music"
"She Walks in Beauty"
"All for Love"
"Elegy"
"To Augusta"
"Epistle to Augusta"
"Maid of Athens"
"Darkness"
"Longing"
"Fare Thee Well"The Prisoner of Chillon"On the Castle of Chillon"
"Song of Saul, Before His Last Battle"
"The Isles of Greece"
"On This Day I Complete My Thirty-Sixth Year"
Thomas Moore
"The Light of Other Days"
"Pro Patria Mori"
"The Meeting of the Waters"
"The Last Rose of Summer"
"The Harp that Once Through Tara's Halls"
"A Canadian Boat-Song"
"The Journey Onwards"
"The Young May Moon"
"Echo"
"At the Mid Hour of Night"
Charles Wolfe
"The Burial of Sir John Moore at Corunna
Percy Bysshe Shelley
"Hymn of Pan"Hellas"Invocation"
"Stanzas Written in Dejection Near Naples"
"I Fear Thy Kisses"
"Lines to an Indian Air"
"To a Skylark"
"Love's Philosophy"
"To the Night"
"Ode to the West Wind"
"Written Among the Euganean Hills, North Italy"
"Hymn to the Spirit of Nature"
"A Lament"
"A Dream of the Unknown"
"The Invitation"
"The Recollection"
"To the Moon"
"A Widow Bird"
"To a Lady, with a Guitar"
"One Word is Too Often Profaned"
"Ozymandias of Egypt"
"The Flight of Love"
"The Cloud"
"Stanzas–April, 1814"
"Music, When Soft Voices Die"
"The Poet's Dream"
"The World's Wanderers"AdonaïsJames Henry Leigh Hunt
"Jenny kiss'd Me"
"Abou Ben Adhem"
John Keats
"The Realm of Fancy"
"Ode on the Poets"
"The Mermaid Tavern"
"Happy Insensibility"
"Ode to a Nightingale"
"Ode on a Grecian Urn"
"Ode to Autumn"
"Ode to Psyche"
"Ode on Melancholy"
"The Eve of St. Agnes"
"La Belle Dame Sans Merci"
"On the Grasshopper and Cricket"
"On First Looking into Chapman's Homer"
"To Sleep"
"The Human Seasons"
"Great Spirits Now on Earth are Sojourning"
"The Terror of Death"
"Last Sonnet"
Walter Savage Landor
"Rose Aylmer"
"Twenty Years Hence"
"Proud Word You Never Spoke"
"Absence"
"Dirce"
"Corinna to Tanagra, from Athens"
"Mother, I Cannot Mind My Wheel"
"Well I Remember"
"No, My Own Love"
"Robert Browning"
"The Death of Artemidora"
"Iphigeneia"
"'Do You Remember Me?'"
"For an Epitaph at Fiesole"
"On Lucretia Borgia's Hair"
"On His Seventy-Fifth Birthday"
"To My Ninth Decade"
"Death Stands Above Me"
"On Living Too Long"
Thomas Hood
"Fair Ines"
"The Bridge of Sighs"
"The Death Bed"
"Past and Present"
Sir Aubrey de Vere
"Glengariff"
Hartley Coleridge
"She Is Not Fair"
Joseph Blanco White
"To Night"
George Darley
"The Loveliness of Love"
Thomas Babington Macaulay, Lord Macaulay
"The Armada"
"A Jacobite's Epitaph"
Sir William Edmondstoune Aytoune
"The Refusal of Charon"
Hugh Miller
"The Babie"
Helen Selina, Lady Dufferin
"Lament of the Irish Emigrant"
Charles Tennyson Turner
"Letty's Globe"
Sir Samuel Ferguson
"The Fair Hills of Ireland"
Elizabeth Barrett Browning
"A Musical Instrument"
"Sonnets from the Portuguese, 1-44"
"The Sleep"
Edward Fitzgerald
"Rubaiyat of Omar Khayyam of Naishápúr"

Vol. 42. English Poetry 3: Tennyson to Whitman

Alfred, Lord Tennyson
"The Lady of Shalott"
"Sweet and Low"
"Tears, Idle Tears"
"Blow, Bugle Blow"
"Home They Brought Her Warrior Dead"
"Now Sleeps the Crimson Petal"
"O Swallow, Swallow"
"Break, Break, Break"
"In the Valley of Cauteretz"
"Vivien's Song"
"Enid's Song"
"Ulysses"
"Locksley Hall"
"Morte D'Arthur"
"The Lotos-Eaters"
"You Ask Me, Why"
"Love Thou Thy Land"
"Sir Galahad"
"The Higher Pantheism"
"Flower in the Crannied Wall"
"Wages"
"The Charge of the Light Brigade"
"The Revenge"
"Rizpah"
"To Virgil"
"Maud"
"Crossing the Bar"
Richard Monckton Milnes, Lord Houghton
"Sonnet"
William Makepeace Thackray
"The End of the Play"
Charles Kingsley
"Airly Beacon"
"The Sands of Dee"
"Youth and Old"
"Ode to the North-east Wind"
J. Wilson
"The Canadian Boat Song"
Robert Browning
"Prospice"
"How They Brought the Good News from Ghent to Aix"The Lost LeaderHome-thoughts, from Abroad"Home-thoughts, from the Sea"
"Parting at Morning"
"The Lost Mistress"
"The Last Ride Together"
"Pippa's Song"
"You'll Love Me Yet"
"My Last Duchess"
"The Bishop Orders His Tomb at Saint Praxed's Church"
"Evelyn Hope"
"A Toccata of Galuppi's"
"Memorabilia"
"The Patriot"
"The Grammarian's Funeral"
"Andrea del Sarto"
"One Word More"
"Abt Volger"
"Rabbi Ben Ezra"
Dedication of The Ring and the Book"Epilogue"
Emily Brontë
Last Lines
"The Old Stoic"
Robert Stephen Hawker
"And Shall Trelawny Die?"
Coventry Patmore
"Departure"
William (Johnson) CoryHeraclitus"Mimnermus in Church"
Sydney Dobell
"The Ballad of Keith of Ravelston"
William Allingham
"The Fairies"
George Mac Donald
"That Holy Thing"
"Baby"
Edward, Earl of Lytton
"The Last Wish"
Arthur Hugh Clough
"Say Not the Struggle Naught Availeth"
"The Stream of Life"
"In a London Square"
"Qua Cursum Ventus"
"Where Lies the Land"
Matthew Arnold
"The Forsaken Merman"
"The Song of the Callicles"
"To Marguerite"
"Requiescat"
"Rugby Chapel"
"Memorial Verses"
"Dover Beach"
"The Better Part"
"Worldly Place"
"The Last Word"
George Meredith
"Love in the Valley"
Alexander Smith
"Barbara"
Charles Dickens
"The Ivy Green"
Thomas Edward Brown
"My Garden"
James Thomson (B.V.)
"Gifts"
Dante Gabriel Rossetti
"The Blessed Damozel"
"The Kings Tragedy"
"Lovesight"
"Heart's Hope"
"Genius in Beauty"
"Silent Noon"
"Love-Sweetness"
"Heart's Compass"
"Her Gifts"
Christina Georgina Rossetti
"Song"
"Remember"
"Up-Hill"
"In the Round Tower at Jhansi"
William Morris
"The Defence of Guenevere"
Prologue of The Earthly Paradise"The Nymph's Song to Hylas"
"The Day Is Coming"
"The Days That Were"
John Boyle O'Reilly
"A White Rose"
Arthur William Edgar O'Shaughnessy
"Ode"
Robert Williams Buchanan
"Liz"
Algernon Charles Swinburne
Chorus from "Atalanta"
"Itylus"
"The Garden of Proserpine"
"A Match"
"A Forsaken Garden"
William Ernest Henley
"Margaritæ Sorori"
"Invictus"
"England, My England"
Robert Louis Stevenson
"In the Highlands"
"The Celestial Surgeon"
"Requiem"
William Cullen Bryant
"Thanatopsis"
"Robert of Lincoln"
"Song of Marion's Men"
"June"
"The Past"
"To a Waterfowl"
"The Death of Lincoln"
Edgar Allan Poe
"Lenore"
"The Haunted Palace
"To Helen"
"The Raven"
"Ulalume"
"The Bells"
"To My Mother"
"For Annie"
"Annabel Lee"
"The Conqueror Worm"
Ralph Waldo Emerson
"Good-Bye"
"The Apology"
"Brahma
"Days"
"Give All to Love"
"Concord Hymn"
"The Humble-Bee"
"The Problem"
"Woodnotes"
"Boston Hymn"
Henry Wadsworth Longfellow
"A Psalm of Life"
"The Light of Stars"
"Hymn to the Night"
"Footsteps of Angels"
"The Wreck of the Hesperus"
"The Village Blacksmith"
"Serenade"
"The Rainy Day"
"The Day is Gone"
"The Bridge"
"Resignation"
"Children"
"The Building of the Ship"
"My Lost Youth"
"The Fiftieth Birthday of Agassiz"
"The Children's Hour"
"Paul Revere's Ride"
"Killed at the Ford"EvangelineJohn Greenleaf Whittier
"The Eternal Goodness"
"Randolph of Roanoke"
"Massachusetts to Virginia"
"Barclay of Ury"
"Maud Muller"
"The Barefoot Boy"
"Skipper Ireson's Ride"
"The Pipes at Lucknow"
"Barbara Frietchie"
Oliver Wendell Holmes
"The Chambered Nautilus"
"Old Ironsides"
"The Last Leaf"
"Contentment"
James Russell Lowell
"The Present Crisis"
"The Pious Editor's Creed"
"The Courtin'"
"Ode Recited at the Harvard Commemoration"
Sidney Lanier
"The Marshes of Glynn"
"The Revenge of Hamish"
"How Love Looked for Hell"
Bret Harte
"The Reveille"
Walt Whitman
"One's Self I Sing"
"Beat! Beat! Drums!"
"Vigil Strange I Kept on the Field One Night"
"Pioneers! O Pioneers!"
"Ethiopia Saluting the Colors"
"The Wound Dresser"
"Give me the Splendid Silent Sun"
"O Captain! My Captain!"
"When Lilacs Last in the Dooryard Bloom'd"
"Prayer of Columbus"
"The Last Invocation"

Vol. 43. American Historical Documents

Introductory Note 
 "The Voyages to Vinland" (c. 1000)
 "The Letter of Columbus to Luis de Sant Angel Announcing His Discovery" (1493)
 "Amerigo Vespucci’s Account of His First Voyage" (1497)
 "John Cabot’s Discovery of North America" (1497)
 "First Charter of Virginia" (1606)
 "The Mayflower Compact" (1620)
 "The Fundamental Orders of Connecticut" (1639)
 "The Massachusetts Body of Liberties" (1641)
 "Arbitrary Government Described and the Government of the Massachusetts Vindicated from that Aspersion", by John Winthrop (1644)
 "The Instrument of Government" (1653)
 "A Healing Question", by Sir Henry Vane" (1656)
 "John Eliot’s "Brief Narrative" (1670)
 "Declaration of Rights" (1765)
 "The Declaration of Independence" (1776)
 "The Mecklenburg Declaration of Independence" (1775)
 "Articles of Confederation" (1777)
 "Articles of Capitulation, Yorktown" (1781)
 "Treaty with Great Britain" (1783)
 "Constitution of the United States" (1787)
 "The Federalist", Nos. 1 and 2 (1787)
 "Opinion of Chief Justice Marshall, in the Case of McCulloch vs. the State of Maryland" (1819)
 "Washington’s First Inaugural Address" (1789)
 "Treaty with the Six Nations" (1794)
 "Washington’s Farewell Address" (1796)
 "Treaty with France (Louisiana Purchase)" (1803)
 "Treaty with Great Britain (End of War of 1812)" (1814)
 "Arrangement as to the Naval Force to Be Respectively Maintained on the American Lakes" (1817)
 "Treaty with Spain (Acquisition of Florida)" (1819)
 "The Monroe Doctrine" (1823)
 "Webster-Ashburton Treaty with Great Britain" (1842)
 "Treaty with Mexico (1848)
 "Fugitive Slave Act" (1850)
 "Lincoln's First Inaugural Address" (1861)
 "Emancipation Proclamation" (1863)
 "Haskell’s Account of the Battle of Gettysburg"
 "Lincoln’s Gettysburg Address" (1863)
 "Proclamation of Amnesty" (1863)
 "Lincoln’s Letter to Mrs. Bixby" (1864)
 "Terms of Lee’s Surrender at Appomattox" (1865)
 "Lee’s Farewell to His Army" (1865)
 "Lincoln’s Second Inaugural Address" (1865)
 "Proclamation Declaring the Insurrection at an End" (1866)
 "Treaty with Russia (Alaska Purchase)" (1867)
 "Annexation of the Hawaiian Islands" (1898)
 "Recognition of the Independence of Cuba" (1898)
 "Treaty with Spain (Cession of Porto Rico and the Philippines)" (1898)
 "Convention Between the United States and the Republic of Panama" (1904)

Vol. 44. Sacred Writings: Volume 1

ConfucianThe Sayings of ConfuciusHebrewThe Book of JobThe Book of PsalmsEcclesiastes; Or, The PreacherChristian, (Part I)The Gospel According to LukeThe Acts of the ApostlesVol. 45. Sacred Writings: Volume 2

Christian, (Part II)

Buddhist
 Buddhist Writings, Translated and Annotated by Henry Clarke WarrenHindu

 The Bhagavad Gita or Song Celestial, Translated by Sir Edwin ArnoldMohammedan
 Chapters from the Koran, Translated and Annotated by E. H. PalmerMecca Suras
Medina Suras

Vol. 46. Elizabethan Drama 1

 Edward the Second, by Christopher Marlowe
 Hamlet, King Lear, Macbeth, and The Tempest, by William Shakespeare

Vol. 47. Elizabethan Drama 2

 The Shoemaker's Holiday, by Thomas Dekker
 The Alchemist, by Ben Jonson
 Philaster, by Beaumont and Fletcher
 The Duchess of Malfi, by John Webster
 A New Way to Pay Old Debts, by Philip Massinger

Vol. 48. Thoughts and Minor Works, Pascal

 Thoughts, letters, and minor works, by Blaise Pascal

Vol. 49. Epic and Saga

 Beowulf The Song of Roland The Destruction of Dá Derga's Hostel The Story of the Volsungs and Niblungs Songs from The Elder EddaVol. 50. Introduction, Reader's Guide, Indexes

 The Editor's Introduction to the Harvard Classics
 Reader's Guide to the Harvard Classics
 Class I
 The History of Civilization
 Race and Language
 Ancient Egypt
 The East in Patriarchal Time
 Ancient Greece: Legendary Ancient Greece: Historic Ancient Rome: Republican Ancient Rome: Imperial Germanic Peoples in Primitive Times
 Ireland in Primitive Times
 The Early Christian Church
 The Mohammedan East
 The Middle Ages
 The Renaissance
 Modern Europe
 America
 Religion and Philosophy
 Hebrew
 Greek
 Roman
 Chinese
 Hindu
 Christian: Primitive and Medieval Mohammedan
 Christian: Modern Modern Philosophers
 Education
 Montaigne...Huxley
 Science
 Hippocrates...Geikie
 Politics
 Plutarch...American Historical Documents
 Voyages and Travels
 Herodotus...Emerson
 Criticism of Literature and the Fine Arts
 Caxton...Stevenson
 Class II
 Drama
 Greek
 English
 Spanish
 French
 German
 Biography and Letters
Plutarch...Stevenson
 Essays
 Montaigne...Stevenson
 Narrative Poetry and Prose Fiction
 Homer...Lanier
 An Index of the First Lines of Poems, Songs and Choruses, Hymns and Psalms
 General Index
 Chronological Index

Lectures

Lectures on The Harvard Classics

The last volume contains sixty lectures introducing and summarizing the covered fields:
History
"General Introduction", by Robert Matteson Johnston
"Ancient History", by William Scott Ferguson
"The French Revolution", by Robert Matteson Johnston
"The Renaissance", by Murray Anthony Potter
"The Territorial Development of the United States", by Fredrick Jackson Turner
Poetry
"General Introduction", by Carlton Noyes
"Homer and the Epic", by Charles Burton Gulick
"Dante", by Charles Hall Grandgent
"The Poems of John Milton", by Ernest Bernbaum
"The English Anthology", by Carleton Noyes
Natural Science
"General Introduction", by Lawrence Joseph Henderson
"Astronomy", by Lawrence Joseph Henderson
"Physics and Chemistry", by Lawrence Joseph Henderson
"The Biological Sciences", by Lawrence Joseph Henderson
"Kelvin on 'Light' and 'The Tides'", by William Morris Davis
Philosophy
"General Introduction", by Ralph Barton Perry
"Socrates, Plato, and the Roman Stoics", by Charles Pomeroy Parker
"The Rise of Modern Philosophy", by Ralph Barton Perry
"Introduction to Kant", by Ralph Barton Perry
"Emerson", by Chester Noyes Greenough
Biography
"General Introduction", William Roscoe Thayer, 
"Plutarch", by William Scott Ferguson, 
"Benvenuto Cellini", by Chandler Rathfon Post
"Franklin and Woolman", by Chester Noyes Greenough
"John Stuart Mill", by Oliver Mitchell Wentworth
Prose Fiction
"General Introduction" by William Allan Neilson, 
"Popular Prose Fiction" by Fred Norris Robinson, 
"Malory", by Gustavus Howard Maynadier
"Cervantes", by Jeremiah D. M. Ford
"Manzoni" by Jeremiah D. M. Ford
Criticism and the Essay
"General Introduction", by Bliss Perry
"What the Middle Ages Read", by William Allan Neilson
"Theories of Poetry", by Bliss Perry
"Æsthetic Criticism in Germany", by William Guild Howard
"The Composition of a Criticism", by Ernest Bernbaum
Education
"General Introduction", by Henry Wyman Holmes
"Francis Bacon", by Ernest Bernbaum
"Locke and Milton", by Henry Wyman Holmes
"Carlyle and Newman", by Frank Wilson Cheney Hersey
"Huxley on Science and Culture", by A. O. Norton
Political Science
"General Introduction", by Thomas Nixon Carver
"Theories of Government in the Renaissance", by O. M. W. Sprague
"Adam Smith and 'The Wealth of Nations'", by Charles J. Bullock
"The Growth of the American Constitution" by William Bennett Munro
"Law and Liberty", by Roscoe Pound
Drama
"General Introduction", by George Pierce Baker
"Greek Tragedy", by Charles Burton Gulick
"The Elizabethan Drama", by William Allan Neilson
"The Faust Legend", by Kuno Francke
"Modern English Drama", by Ernest Bernbaum
Voyages and Travel
"General Introduction", by Roland Burrage Dixon
"Herodotus on Egypt", by George H. Chase
"The Elizabethan Adventurers", by William Allan Neilson
"The Era of Discovery", by William Bennett Monro
"Darwin’s Voyage of the Beagle", by George Howard Parker
Religion
"General Introduction", by Ralph Barton Perry
"Buddhism", by Charles Rockwell Lanman
"Confucianism", by Dwight Sheffield
"Greek Religion", by Clifford Herschel Moore
"Pascal", by Charles Henry Conrad Wright

 The Harvard Classics Shelf of Fiction

The Harvard Classics Shelf of Fiction is a supplement of 20 volumes of modern fiction added in 1917. Items were selected for inclusion by Charles W. Eliot, with notes and introductions by William Allan Neilson.

 Vol. 1. HENRY FIELDING 1
 The History of Tom Jones, part 1, by Henry Fielding
 Vol. 2. HENRY FIELDING 2
 The History of Tom Jones, part 2, by Henry Fielding
 Vol. 3. LAURENCE STERN, JANE AUSTEN
 A Sentimental Journey, by Laurence Sterne
 Pride and Prejudice, by Jane Austen
 Vol. 4. SIR WALTER SCOTT
 Guy Mannering, by Sir Walter Scott
 Vol. 5. WILLIAM MAKEPEACE THACKERAY 1
 Vanity Fair, part 1, by William Makepeace Thackeray
 Vol. 6. WILLIAM MAKEPEACE THACKERAY 2
 Vanity Fair, part 2, by William Makepeace Thackeray
 Vol. 7. CHARLES DICKENS 1
 David Copperfield, part 1, by Charles Dickens
 Vol. 8. CHARLES DICKENS 2
 David Copperfield, part 2, by Charles Dickens
 Vol. 9. GEORGE ELIOT
 The Mill on the Floss, by George Eliot
 Vol. 10. HAWTHORNE, IRVING, POE, BRET HARTE, MARK TWAIN, HALE
 The Scarlet Letter and Rappaccini's Daughter, by Nathaniel Hawthorne
 Rip Van Winkle and The Legend of Sleepy Hollow, by Washington Irving
 Eleonora, The Fall of the House of Usher, and The Purloined Letter, by Edgar Allan Poe
 The Luck of Roaring Camp, The Outcasts of Poker Flat, and The Idyl of Red Gulch, by Francis Bret Harte
 Jim Smiley and His Jumping Frog, by Samuel L. Clemens
 The Man Without a Country, by Edward Everett Hale
 Vol. 11. HENRY JAMES, JR.
 The Portrait of a Lady, by Henry James
 Vol. 12. VICTOR HUGO
 Notre Dame de Paris, by Victor Marie Hugo
 Vol. 13. BALZAC, SAND, DE MUSSET, DAUDET, DE MAUPASSANT
 Old Goriot, by Honoré Balzac
 The Devil's Pool, by George Sand
 The Story of a White Blackbird, by Alfred de Musset
 The Siege of Berlin, The Last Class—The Story of a Little Alsatian, The Child Spy, The Game of Billiards, and The Bad Zouave, by Alphonse Daudet
 Walter Schnaffs’ Adventure and Two Friends, by Guy de Maupassant
 Vol. 14. JOHANN WOLFGANG GOETHE
 Wilhelm Meister's Apprenticeship, by Johann Wolfgang Goethe
 Vol. 15. GOETHE, KELLER, STORM, FONTANE
 The Sorrows of Young Werther, by Johann Wolfgang Goethe
 The Banner of the Upright Seven, by Gottfried Keller
 The Rider on the White Horse, by Theodor Storm
 Trials and Tribulations, by Theodor Fontane
 Vol. 16. LEO NIKOLAEVITCH TOLSTOY 1
 Anna Karenina, part 1, by Leo Tolstoy
 Vol. 17. LEO NIKOLAEVITCH TOLSTOY 2
 Anna Karenina, part 2, and Ivan the Fool, by Leo Tolstoy
 Vol. 18. FYODOR DOSTOEVSKY
 Crime and Punishment, by Fyodor Dostoevsky
 Vol. 19. IVAN TURGENEV
 A House of Gentlefolk and Fathers and Children, by Ivan Turgenev
 Vol. 20. VALERA, BJØRNSON, KIELLAND
 Pepita Jimenez, by Juan Valera
 A Happy Boy, by Bjørnstjerne Bjørnson
 Skipper Worse'', by Alexander L. Kielland

Media

Television 
The Waltons season 2 episode 24 "The Five-Foot Shelf", where a broke salesman (of the Harvard books) buys a doll for his daughter with Olivia's down-payment on a set of books.

References

External links 

 
  (Online version.)
  (All volumes.)

Book collecting
Classics publications
Great Books
Harvard University publications
Publications established in 1909
Series of books